Aššur-šaddûni or -šaduni, inscribed maš-šur-KUR-ú-ni or [maš-šur-K]UR-u-ni and meaning “(the god) Aššur (is) our mountain,” was the ruler of Assyria for just "one complete month" (1 UTU UD.MEŠ-te) during the 15th century BC, the 64th to appear on the Assyrian King List. He succeeded his father, Nur-ili, but was ousted in a coup by his uncle, Aššur-rabi I.

Biography

There remains uncertainty concerning the dating of his accession, as the two subsequent Assyrian kings have unknown reign lengths, effectively disconnecting him and his predecessors from the firmer chronology of the later Assyrian King List. Although there are no extant contemporary inscriptions for him or his immediate predecessor or successors, his name appears on two of the Assyrian King Lists (Khorsabad and SDAS) and faintly at the end of the first column of the Synchronistic Kinglist, level with where one of the successors' to Kassite Babylonian king Kaštiliašu III might be supposed to appear.

The King lists describe his overthrow: ina GIŠ.GU.ZA ú-šat-bi GIŠ.GU.ZA iṣ-bat, "(Aššur-šaddûni) from the throne, he deposed, the throne he (Aššur-rabi) seized."

Inscriptions

References

15th-century BC Assyrian kings
Leaders ousted by a coup
Year of birth unknown